The Old Berrien County Jail is a historic site in Nashville, Berrien County, Georgia. It was built in 1903. It was added to the National Register of Historic Places on August 26, 1982. It is located at North Jefferson Street.

The Old Berrien County Jail was the site of the last hanging in Berrien County. A modern jail replaced the historic prison in 1965.

See also
Berrien County Courthouse
National Register of Historic Places listings in Berrien County, Georgia

References

External links
 

Jails on the National Register of Historic Places in Georgia (U.S. state)
Buildings and structures in Berrien County, Georgia
National Register of Historic Places in Berrien County, Georgia
Jails in Georgia (U.S. state)
Government buildings completed in 1903